Torre la Ribera, in Catalan: Tor-la-ribera, or in Aragonese: Torlarribera, is a municipality located in the province of Huesca, Aragon, Spain. According to the 2004 census (INE), the municipality has a population of 117 inhabitants.

References

Municipalities in the Province of Huesca